The Ministry of Transportation of Egypt (MOT) is the part of the Cabinet of Egypt concerned with transportation. It is responsible for meeting the transportation needs of the country, whether by sea, land or air, and is aligned with Egyptian national development plans. It is governed by the Minister of Transportation.

Objectives
Some of the ministries tasks follow.
Development of facilities and the promotion of maritime transport, including global development in the shipping industry
Modernize and develop the network of existing roads to provide greater comfort, capacity and safety, and also to expand this network to meet future needs for development.
Development of inland waterways of the river transport service and provide the highest levels of security.
Making plans for the establishment and development and strengthening of railway networks on the national level
Develop plans to establish subway networks (Cairo Metro).
Work on the development of land ports and enhancing their performance.
Develop plans to ensure the provision of specialized labor in the area of the ministry's activities.
 Activate the studies and research in the field of work of the ministry.

President Abdel Fattah el-Sisi set ambitious goals for the Ministry of Transportation, when he took office in 2014 and by June 2018, the Ministry of Transportation had reported several achievements.

Ministers

Affiliated bodies
The ministry is affiliated with a variety of bodies including:
The General Authority for planning transportation projects
National Authority for Railways
National Authority for Tunnels
General Authority for Roads, Bridges and Land Transport
River Transportation Authority 
The General Authority for Land Ports and dry
National Institute of Transport
The General Authority for Alexandria Port
General Authority of Red Sea Ports
General Authority for Port Said
Damietta Port Authority
Maritime Transport Sector
General Authority for Maritime Safety
Subway Operating System
Super Jet
Maritime Data Bank of Egypt

Roads and bridges
The Ministry's goals are to provide a road network meeting international standards and ensure competitive service in the transport of passengers and goods and a high degree of speed and security. MOT's goals are also to create a mass transit system developed and integrated between the provinces, while encouraging the private sector.

In June 2018, the Ministry of Transportation reported that 11 roads with a total length of 865 km had been constructed. New roads had been constructed and others had been doubled or lengthened.

Railway projects
The MOT's goals are to focus on the development of the system of transporting goods and passengers through the modernization of the fleet of tractors and wagons by importing from abroad as well as the modernization of signaling systems and track maintenance.

In October, 2018 a contract was signed between Russia, Holland and Egypt for, among other things, the modernization of Egypt's railways. Negotiations had been in the works, at least since January 2018, with representatives from dozens of Russian companies visiting Egypt to discuss multiple construction projects. The contract speaks of a $7 billion investment.

Subway projects
One of the goals are to develop the system of tunnels and complete the establishment of the remaining stages of the third and fourth line. In June 2018, the Ministry of Transportation reported on the phases that were completed and were still ongoing on the subway third and fourth lines. A new electric train line for the new administrative capital of Egypt had been implemented. Improvements and modernization included supplying air-conditioned trains, building escalators and electric elevators at metro stations and supplying new gates and ticket machines for the existing first and second metro lines and stations.

Maritime transport
The long-term goals are to activate and expand the Egyptian ports to increase capacity available for carriage of exported and imported goods and passenger transfer and to create new ports and develop the Egyptian Maritime Fleet. The objective is to build on 
the advantage of Egypt's geographical location to connect transportation between East and West, North and South.

Red Sea ports
In June 2018, the Ministry of Transportation reported that the construction of new passenger terminals had been completed at Safaga port, Hurghada port, and Nuweiba Port. A waiting station had been constructed at the Hurghada port.

Alexandria and Dekheila ports
In June 2018, the Ministry of Transportation reported that the shipping corridor's depth was increased to 15.5 meters and renovations were made to a bridge.

Port Damietta
In June 2018, as part Egypt's national plans to improve the ports, engineers improved the shipping corridor, constructed new berths for general merchandise and for maritime service, and constructed and supplied 4 marine locomotives.

Dry ports
Port Qustal was established for trade between Egypt and Sudan East of the Nile. A new hub was constructed in Arqeen for Egypt and Sudan West of the Nile.

River transport
Two river ports will be constructed; one in Qena and the other in Sohag Governorate, and the foundation stones were laid in April 2018 and May 2018, respectively.

See also

Cabinet of Egypt

References

External links
 Ministry of Transportation official website
 Ministry of Transportation on Facebook 
 Egypt's Cabinet Database

Transportation
Transport organisations based in Egypt
Egypt